All Summers End is a 2017 American drama film directed and written by Kyle Wilamowski. The film stars Tye Sheridan, Kaitlyn Dever, Austin Abrams, Beau Mirchoff, Paula Malcomson and Annabeth Gish.

Plot 
Conrad (Sheridan), Hunter (Abrams) and Tim (Lee) are close friends living in a small town. Grace (Dever) takes a liking to Conrad and they start spending a lot of time with each other, which stresses Conrad's relationship with Hunter and Tim. Having promised Hunter and Tim that they could hang out on the 4th of July, Conrad declines an invitation to watch the fireworks with Grace's family. The three boys drive around the town stealing garden ornaments and Conrad – on a dare – goes to steal a plant from the porch of Grace's house. Unbeknownst to them, Grace had earlier had a fight with her brother Eric (Mirchoff), who has consequently stayed home while Grace and her parents went to see the fireworks.

The boys are nearly caught and Eric gets in his car, chasing them to the outskirts of the town. The boys narrowly avoid a deer that wanders onto the road, but Eric hits the deer and crashes into a tree. The boys argue about whether to call for help, as he is still breathing. Hunter and Tim vote to leave, hoping someone would pass by soon, and, feeling pressured, Conrad decides to leave too. The next day, word spreads through the town that Eric has died from his injuries. Grace is ridden with guilt due to her fight with Eric and finds comfort in Conrad, who has fallen out with Tim and Hunter due to their refusal to help Eric at the scene of the accident.

Conrad tries to tell Grace the truth but is interrupted by her parents. As Grace finds comfort in Conrad, the two become closer. On the night that Grace's parents go away to Eric's college to pack up his dorm room, she loses her virginity to Conrad. Grace leaves to go to church the next morning, telling Conrad that he would have the house to himself, but her parents return early. Grace's parents discover the discarded condom wrapper and, feeling betrayed, tell Conrad to leave.

Grace has a fight with her parents and goes to look for Conrad, finding him in an abandoned house he had shown her earlier. Conrad, now in distress, confesses the truth to Grace and she leaves, telling him that she never wants to see him again. Conrad goes home and tells his mother what had happened. Following this talk, he goes to see Grace's parents to tell them the truth and return the plant.

It is revealed that Conrad never did get back in touch with Grace and hopes she's okay wherever she is. An adult Conrad eventually marries and has a son, whom he names Eric.

Cast 
 Tye Sheridan as Conrad Stevens, Grace's love interest
 Pablo Schreiber as Older Conrad Stevens
 Kaitlyn Dever as Grace Turner, Conrad's love interest
 Austin Abrams as Hunter Gorski, Conrad's friend
 Ryan Lee as Timmy, Conrad's other friend
 Paula Malcomson as Mrs. Stevens, Conrad's mother
 Annabeth Gish as Mrs. Turner, Grace's mother
 Bill Sage as Mr. Turner, Grace's father
 Beau Mirchoff as Eric Turner. Grace's deceased brother

Production 
The film was shot in North Carolina in July 2013 under the title Grass Stains.

Release
In April 2018, Gravitas Ventures picked up North American distribution rights for the film, retitled All Summers End, and set the film's release date for June 1, 2018.

Reception
On Rotten Tomatoes, All Summers End has an approval rating of 20% based on five reviews (one positive and four negative), with an average rating of 3.50/10. In a positive review, Stephen Farber of The Hollywood Reporter wrote, "the resolution seems honest and mature, and a brief epilogue is so powerful that it makes us forget some of the film's earlier lapses. The emotionally devastating last line socks the whole movie home." Robert Abele of the Los Angeles Times, however, was critical of the film's dramatic structure, writing "Writer-director Kyle Wilamowski smothers his bid for nuanced emotion in the cardboard mechanics of bad-decision drama."

References

External links 
 

2017 films
2017 directorial debut films
2017 drama films
2010s English-language films
American drama films
Films scored by Joel P. West
Films set in North Carolina
Films shot in North Carolina
2010s American films